Megan Elizabeth McKenna (born 26 September 1992) is an English television personality and singer. After making appearances on Ex on the Beach (2015–2016), she received wider attention for appearing on Celebrity Big Brother (2016) and The Only Way Is Essex (2016–2017). McKenna then launched her music career, releasing her debut studio album, Story of Me (2018), and she later went on to win The X Factor: Celebrity (2019). Since her win, McKenna has continued to release music, as well as competed in the BBC series Celebrity MasterChef (2021 and 2022).

Early and personal life
McKenna was born on 26 September 1992 in Barking, London. In her autobiography, Mouthy, McKenna explained that as a child, she was bullied at school. In order for her to attend the Arts Educational School to study musical theatre, her family relocated to Chiswick.

In 2016, McKenna revealed that she suffers from coeliac disease. In March 2016, she began dating The Only Way Is Essex cast member Pete Wicks, but the pair broke up in 2017. In 2022, McKenna authored a gluten-free cookbook, titled Can You Make That Gluten-Free?.

Career

2009–2019: Reality television and Story of Me
In 2009, McKenna reached the semi-finals of third series of Britain's Got Talent as part of the music duo Harmony. In the same year, she appeared in an advertisement for the second series of The Inbetweeners. McKenna appeared in an episode of The Only Way Is Essex in 2010, where she auditioned to be part of the girl group LOLA. As part of LOLA, she performed at T4 Stars of 2010. She also auditioned for The X Factor twice, making it to bootcamp each time.

In 2015, McKenna appeared on the third series of MTV reality series Ex on the Beach. She returned to the programme for the fourth series, alongside Jordan Davies. She departed from Ex on the Beach early due to the death of her grandfather. She went on to become a housemate in the seventeenth series of Celebrity Big Brother in 2016. During her time in the house, she received a formal warning for using aggressive and threatening behaviour towards her fellow housemates. She was the fourth housemate to be evicted having received the fewest votes to save, spending a total of 18 days in the house. In March 2016, she joined The Only Way Is Essex as a full-time cast member. In May 2017, McKenna launched her own restaurant, "MCK Grill", in Woodford Green. Later in 2017, she released a range of hair extension pieces with Easilocks. McKenna made her final appearance on The Only Way Is Essex on 25 October 2017, expressing an interest in focusing on her music career.

In 2017, McKenna starred in her own reality series, There’s Something About Megan. The series focused on McKenna travelling to Nashville to begin a career in country music. The series consisted of three episodes, and aired on ITVBe. After the series finale, McKenna launched her music career, releasing her debut extended play, featuring "High Heeled Shoes" and "Far Cry from Love". The two songs topped the British iTunes chart within 24 hours of their release, and on the UK Singles Chart, "High Heeled Shoes" peaked at number 43, with "Far Cry From Love" peaking at number 53.

In December 2017, McKenna embarked on her first headlining tour to promote the release of "High Heeled Shoes", which consisted of four dates, visiting The Sugarmill, The Venue, Palace Theatre and Scala. In July 2018, she supported Michael Bublé at the British Summer Time show at Hyde Park. On 26 July 2018, McKenna released her debut autobiographical book, Mouthy, published by John Blake. The book topped the Sunday Times bestseller list. In August 2018, she released her debut clothing range, Studio Mouthy. This accompanied her makeup range, Mouthy Cosmetics. Later that month, McKenna took part in the first series of Celebs on the Farm. She was eliminated second, finishing in seventh place. McKenna released her debut album Story of Me on 7 December 2018. The album peaked at number four on the UK Country Chart. From May 2019 to September 2019, McKenna embarked on the Story of Me Tour across the United Kingdom. In February 2019, she participated in the sixth series of the E4 reality series Celebs Go Dating.

2019–2021: The X Factor: Celebrity and other projects
From October to November 2019, McKenna competed in the ITV series The X Factor: Celebrity and was mentored by Louis Walsh. For her audition, she performed "Everything but You", a song from Story of Me. On 30 November, she was crowned the winner of the competition with 46.3% of the final vote, which not only gave Walsh his third overall victory of the show but also won her a record deal with Syco.

In February 2020, McKenna began recording her second studio album, and later that month, it was announced that she is set to support Lionel Richie on the British leg of his 2021 tour. In August 2020, McKenna released a clothing range with online retailer In The Style. On 5 February 2021, McKenna announced that "This" would be released as a single on 19 February 2021. In April 2021, she was announced as a contestant on the BBC competition series Celebrity MasterChef. She reached the final. On 28 May 2021, McKenna the song "Ruin Your Night", which was followed by "Won’t Go Back Again" on 24 September 2021.

In October 2021, McKenna announced the release of her second book. Titled Can You Make That Gluten Free?, the book is a gluten free recipe book inspired by her coeliac diagnosis. On 19 November 2021, McKenna released her first original Christmas song called "Family at Christmas".

2022–present: Independent music
In June 2022, McKenna announced that she had parted ways with her record label. She revealed that her pop music releases with them had been heavily influenced by them, as they had preferred them to the country songs McKenna had instead wanted to release. Following the departure, she announced that she would be independently releasing a song a week, beginning with the single "Baby Talk" on 24 June 2022. Later that month, she performed at Glastonbury Festival, a moment she had "dreamt of" throughout her career. In December 2022 McKenna took part in Celebrity Masterchef Festive Extravaganza which screened in December 2022. This time McKenna was victorious and won the Golden Whisk, beating dancer AJ Pritchard, actor Chizzy Akudolu, and British drag performer Kitty Scott-Claus.

Filmography

Discography

 Story of Me (2018)

References

External links

 

1992 births
Big Brother (British TV series) contestants
Britain's Got Talent contestants
Country pop musicians
English autobiographers
English country singers
Gluten-free cookbook writers
Living people
People educated at the Arts Educational Schools
People from Barking, London
People from Essex
Syco Music artists
Television personalities from Essex
The X Factor (British TV series) winners